The 2002 Boise State Broncos football team represented Boise State University in the 2002 NCAA Division I-A football season. Boise State competed as a member of the Western Athletic Conference (WAC), and played their home games at Bronco Stadium in Boise, Idaho. The Broncos were led by second-year head coach Dan Hawkins. The Broncos finished the season 12–1 and 8–0 in conference to win their first WAC title and played in the Humanitarian Bowl, where they defeated Iowa State, 34–16. The 2002 marked the first season that Boise State was ranked in the top 25 since moving to Division I-A in 1996.

Schedule

Roster

References

Boise State
Boise State Broncos football seasons
Western Athletic Conference football champion seasons
Famous Idaho Potato Bowl champion seasons
Boise State Broncos football